Jaures Kombila is a 21st-century Gabonese contortionist who is so flexible that he has been accused of witchcraft.

Early life 
Kombila's body was flexible from a young age.

Career 
Kombila works as a professional contortionist. His unusual flexibility has led to stigma and him being accused of being a witch.

As of September 2022, over 115,500 people followed Kombila's TikTok channel.

References

External links 
 Jaures Kombila on TikTok
 Jaures Kombila on Instagram

Year of birth missing (living people)
Living people
Gabonese people
Contortionists
People accused of witchcraft
21st-century Gabonese people